The 1937 Big Ten Conference football season was the 42nd season of college football played by the member schools of the Big Ten Conference (also known as the Western Conference) and was a part of the 1937 college football season.

The 1937 Minnesota Golden Gophers football team, under head coach Bernie Bierman, won the Big Ten championship, led the conference in scoring offense (23.0 points per game), compiled a 6–2 record, and was ranked No. 5 in the final AP poll. End Ray King was named a first-team All-American by two selectors, and fullback Andy Uram was received first-team honors from the Associated Press. Halfback Rudy Gmitro was awarded the team's most valuable player award.

The 1937 Ohio State Buckeyes football team, under head coach Francis Schmidt finished in second place with a 6–2 record, shut out six of eight opponents, led the Big Ten in scoring defense (2.9 points allowed per game), and was ranked No. 8 in the final AP poll. Guard Gust Zarnas was selected as a first-team All-American by three selectors. Back Jim McDonald was the second player selected in the 1938 NFL Draft.

Corbett Davis of Indiana won the Chicago Tribune Silver Football trophy as the Big Ten's most valuable player. He was also the first player selected in the 1938 NFL Draft.

Season overview

Results and team statistics

Key
PPG = Average of points scored per game
PAG = Average of points allowed per game
MVP = Most valuable player as voted by players on each team as part of the voting process to determine the winner of the Chicago Tribune Silver Football trophy

Regular season

September 25
 Minnesota 69, North Dakota State 7.
 Ohio State 14, TCU 0
 Indiana 12, Centre 0.
 Northwestern 33, Iowa State 0.
 Purdue 33, Butler 7.
 Wisconsin 32, South Dakota State 0.
 Illinois 20, Ohio 6.
 Vanderbilt 18, Chicago 0.
 Washington 14, Iowa 0.

October 2
 Nebraska 14, Minnesota 9.
 Ohio State 13, Purdue 0.
 Michigan State 19, Michigan 14.
 Wisconsin 12, Marquette 0.
 Illinois 0, DePaul 0.

October 9
 Minnesota 6, Indiana 0.
 USC 13, Ohio State 12.
 Northwestern 7, Michigan 0.
 Wisconsin 27, Chicago 0.
 Iowa 14, Bradley Tech 7.
 Purdue 7, Carnegie Mellon 0.
 Illinois 0, Notre Dame 0.

October 16
 Indiana 13, Illinois 6.
 Minnesota 39, Michigan 6.
 Northwestern 14, Purdue 7.
 Wisconsin 13, Iowa 6.

October 23
 Michigan 7, Iowa 6.
 Ohio State 7, Northwestern 0.
 Indiana 27, Cincinnati 0.
 Pittsburgh 21, Wisconsin 0.

October 30
 Notre Dame 7, Minnesota 6.
 Michigan 7, Illinois 6.
 Northwestern 14, Wisconsin 6.
 Ohio State 39, Chicago 0.
 Purdue 13, Iowa 0.
 Nebraska 7, Indiana 0.

November 6
 Illinois 6, Northwestern 0.
 Indiana 10, Ohio State 0.
 Michigan 13, Chicago 12.	
 Minnesota 35, Iowa 10.
 Fordham 21, Purdue 3.

November 13
 Indiana 3, Iowa 0.
 Minnesota 7, Northwestern 0.
 Ohio State 19, Illinois 0.
 Purdue 7, Wisconsin 7.
 Michigan 7, Penn 0.
 Chicago 26, Beloit 9.

November 20
 Illinois 21, Chicago 0.
 Minnesota 13, Wisconsin 6.
 Ohio State 21, Michigan 0.
 Purdue 13, Indiana 7.
 Notre Dame 7, Northwestern 0.
 Nebraska 28, Iowa 0.

Bowl games
No Big Ten teams participated in any bowl games during the 1937 season.

All-Big Ten players

The following players were picked by the Associated Press (AP) and/or the United Press (UP) as first-team players on the 1937 All-Big Ten Conference football team.

All-Americans

No Big Ten players were selected as consensus first-team players on the 1937 College Football All-America Team. However, three Big Ten players received first-team honors from at least one selector. They were:

1938 NFL Draft
The following Big Ten players were selected in the first seven rounds of the 1938 NFL Draft:

References